The 2018 NXT TakeOver: WarGames was the 22nd NXT TakeOver and the second annual NXT WarGames professional wrestling livestreaming event produced by WWE. It was held exclusively for wrestlers from the promotion's NXT brand division. The event aired exclusively on the WWE Network and took place on November 17, 2018, in the Staples Center in Los Angeles, California as part of that year's Survivor Series weekend.

Five matches were contested at the event. In the main event, Pete Dunne, Ricochet, and War Raiders defeated The Undisputed Era in a WarGames match. In the penultimate match, Tommaso Ciampa defeated Velveteen Dream to retain the NXT Championship and Aleister Black defeated Johnny Gargano.

Production

Background
TakeOver was a series of professional wrestling shows that began in May 2014, as WWE's then-developmental league NXT held their second WWE Network-exclusive event, billed as TakeOver. In subsequent months, the "TakeOver" moniker became the brand used by WWE for all of their NXT live specials. The 2018 WarGames was scheduled as the 22nd NXT TakeOver event and was held on November 17, 2018, in the Staples Center in Los Angeles, California as a support show for that year's Survivor Series pay-per-view. It was the second in the TakeOver: WarGames chronology, a subseries of TakeOvers that feature the WarGames match and were originally held as a support show for WWE's annual Survivor Series pay-per-view.

Storylines 

The card comprised five matches. The matches resulted from scripted storylines, where wrestlers portrayed heroes, villains, or less distinguishable characters that built tension and culminated in a wrestling match or series of matches. Results were predetermined by WWE's writers on the NXT brand, while storylines were produced on their weekly television program, NXT.

On the July 25 episode of NXT, Aleister Black lost the NXT Championship to Tommaso Ciampa due to interference from Johnny Gargano. On the August 8 episode of NXT, Black and Gargano fought to a no contest when Ciampa attacked both men. A triple threat match between the three for the title was scheduled for TakeOver: Brooklyn 4. After the show was over, Black was later found unconscious in the parking lot (This was done to allow Black to recover from a groin injury he underwent surgery for). With Black out of action after a groin injury, the match was changed to a Last Man Standing match between Ciampa and Gargano, which Ciampa won. On the October 24 edition of NXT, Gargano was revealed as the one who attacked Black before their original TakeOver: Brooklyn 4 title match, turning heel in the process. The following week, a match between the two was scheduled for the event.

On the October 31, 2018 episode of NXT, Adam Cole and Bobby Fish of The Undisputed Era were scheduled to face War Raiders (Hanson and Rowe) in the main event. However, Hanson and Rowe attacked the group during a backstage promo. The fight ended up in the ring, where the Undisputed Era got the upper hand. Ricochet entered on the War Raiders' behalf, but was ultimately overtaken. Pete Dunne evened the odds for Hanson, Rowe and Ricochet. During the brawl, NXT general manager William Regal announced that the two sides would face each other in a WarGames match.

At Evolution, Shayna Baszler won the NXT Women's Championship back from Kairi Sane after interference from Baszler's fellow  and former MMA Four Horsewomen Jessamyn Duke and Marina Shafir, becoming the first two-time NXT Women's Champion. On the November 7 episode of NXT, as Sane was invoking her rematch clause, a two-out-of-three-falls match between the two for the title was scheduled for TakeOver.

Event

Preliminary matches 
The event opened with Matt Riddle facing Kassius Ohno. Riddle immediately performed a jumping high knee on Ohno to win in only six seconds.

Next, Shayna Baszler defended the NXT Women's Championship against Kairi Sane in a two-out-of-three falls match. Baszler scored the first fall by making Sane submit to the "Kirifuda Clutch" after interference from Jessamyn Duke and Marina Shafir. Sane scored the second fall after an "Insane Elbow" on Baszler. Duke and Shafir tried to interfere again only for Dakota Kai and Io Shirai to stop them. Shirai then performed a Moonsault on Duke and Shafir. Sane performed an "Insane Elbow", but Baszler countered into a roll up to retain the title.

After that, Aleister Black faced Johnny Gargano. Gargano performed a slingshot DDT on Black for a near-fall. Black performed a diving meteora on Gargano for a near-fall. Gargano applied the "Garga-No Escape", but Black touched the ropes. In the end, Black performed two consecutive "Black Masses" on Gargano to win.

In the penultimate match, Tommaso Ciampa defended the NXT Championship against Velveteen Dream. Ciampa performed a "Project Ciampa" on Dream for a near-fall. Dream performed the "Purple Rainmaker" on Ciampa for a near-fall. Dream attempted a second "Purple Rainmaker" again on the ring apron but Ciampa avoided. Ciampa performed an elevated DDT on Dream onto the metal divider between the rings to retain the championship.

Main event 
The main event was a WarGames match between The Undisputed Era (Adam Cole, Bobby Fish, Kyle O'Reilly, and Roderick Strong) and the team of WWE United Kingdom Champion Pete Dunne, NXT North American Champion Ricochet and War Raiders (Hanson and Rowe). The match began with Cole and Ricochet in the ring. After 5 minutes, O’Reilly of The Undisputed Era joined the match. Three minutes after, Hanson would join the match, and following a further three minutes, Strong joined the match. After another three minutes, Rowe joined the match and simultaneously performed a powerslam and powerbomb on O’Reilly and Strong respectively. After another 3 minutes, Fish escaped and locked Dunne in a cage, throwing the key lock into the audience. Fish then retrieved chairs for the Undisputed Era who struck Ricochet, Hanson and Rowe with the chairs. Three minutes afterwards, the referees attempted to unlock Dunne's cage, but failed to do so as The Undisputed Era's and Dunne's cages used different keys for the individual locks and thus a bolt-cutter had to be used to open the cage. Dunne struck Fish and O’Reilly with a kendo stick and retrieved tables, trash cans, a steel chain and kendo sticks for his team. During the climax, Cole reversed the "Bitter End" into a DDT and performed the "Last Shot" on Dunne for a near-fall. Ricochet and Cole went up to the top of the cage, and all competitors climbed up with them to help their team gain momentum. Cole got suplexed and everybody was left lying, and Ricochet performed a double Moonsault onto the pile. Cole went for another attempt at the Last Shot, but Dunne reversed it into the "Bitter End" and Ricochet executed a springboard 450° splash and both of them pinned Cole for the win.

Results

References

External links
 

WarGames 2018
2018 WWE Network events
2018 in Los Angeles
Events in Los Angeles
November 2018 events in the United States
Professional wrestling in Los Angeles